Marvin (Mikhl) I. Herzog (September 13, 1927 — June 28, 2013) was a Yiddish language Professor at Columbia University.

Biography
Marvin I. Herzog received his Ph.D. from Columbia under Uriel Weinreich.

In 1967, he became the director, and then the editor-in-chief, of the Yiddish Atlas Project at Columbia University, which publishes, in conjunction with YIVO, The Language and Culture Atlas of Ashkenazic Jewry (LCAAJ).

Books
Herzog, Marvin I., The Yiddish Language in Northern Poland. Its Geography and History, Indiana Univ., Bloomington, and The Hague, Mouton & Co., 1965.
Herzog, Marvin, et al. ed., YIVO, The Language and Culture Atlas of Ashkenazic Jewry, 3 vols., Max Niemeyer Verlag, Tübingen, 1992–2000, .

See also
Yiddish dialects

References

External links
EYDES (LCAAJ's website)
LCAAJ Collection of Spoken Yiddish @ Columbia
Columbia's Yiddish Department

1927 births
2013 deaths
Canadian Jews
People from Toronto
Linguists of Yiddish
Columbia University alumni
Columbia University faculty
Sociolinguists
Linguists from the United States